Ragi mudde, ragi sangati or kali, colloquially simply referred to as either  (which means 'lump') or , i.e. 'flour'); is a meal in the state of Karnataka and the Rayalaseema region in Andhra Pradesh. It is mainly popular with the rural folk of Karnataka. In Tamil Nadu, especially in Western Tamil Nadu, it is called ragi kali.  is the main food in Kolar, Mandya, Hassan, Mysore, Tumkur districts in Karnataka and Rayalaseema Region in Andhra Pradesh. A similar variation known as Dhindo is also eaten in Northeast India, Nepal and Bhutan.

Preparation
A tablespoon of  flour is first mixed with water to make a very thin paste and later added to a thick bottomed vessel containing water on a stove top. As this mixture boils and reaches the brim of the vessel,  flour is added which forms a mound on top of boiling water. Once the  flour is added, it requires immediate mixing (to avoid lumps) with the help of a wooden stick (: /), the flour is beaten to a smooth dough-like consistency with no lumps. Then it is allowed to cook on medium-high flame. This hot dough is then rested on low heat before being rounded on a wooden board into tennis-ball-sized balls with wet hands. Thus prepared  balls are broken down into smaller balls using fingers and dipped into saaru/hesru, chutney or gojju.  is not supposed to be chewed.

The  is often flavoured by mixing a dash of spicy, freshly ground green-chilli paste, in one's plate according to taste.  is a popular combination among the farming communities in Karnataka.  is made from the decanted water, which remains after an assortment of pulses are steamed, usually along with a couple of pods of garlic. This water takes up the earthy flavour of the pulses to nicely complement the earthy flavour of the  itself. Browned onions, red chillies, and some garlic are browned, and then ground into a paste along with grated coconut. This is added to the water, and the mixture is finally seasoned with oggarane.

This is often simply a stew comprising steamed horsegram, as well as the water used to steam it, with added salt. Sometimes, hyacinth-beans replace the horsegram.

 is rich in the same nutrients that are found in finger millet, namely fibre, calcium, and iron.

Eaten with

In most of southern Karnataka/old Mysore it is eaten almost daily. Many luxury hotels serve  on special occasions. In the Rayalaseema region of Andhra Pradesh, it is eaten with pappu and chatnee.  is also a main food in Anantapur district. It is served in almost all hotels in Anantapur district.

See also
 Ragi rotti
 Upsaaru
 Cuisine of Karnataka

Notes

Karnataka cuisine
Andhra cuisine